Wilbur Eugene Hess (January 15, 1913 – January 27, 1992) was an American tennis player.

Hess was born in Cleburne, Texas and attended Central High School, Fort Worth, Texas. After winning a state high school singles championship, Hess played varsity tennis for Rice Institute in Houston and as a senior won the 1935 national intercollegiate singles title. He reached the singles fourth round of the 1935 U.S. National Championships and had a best national ranking of 16th.

An investment banker by profession, Hess was a 1988 inductee into the Texas Tennis Hall of Fame. His elder brother Jake was a tennis player for Rice, as well an All-American in basketball.

References

External links
 

1913 births
1992 deaths
American male tennis players
Tennis people from Texas
Rice Owls men's tennis players
People from Cleburne, Texas